Torre de Babel (English: Tower of Babel) is a Brazilian primetime telenovela produced by TV Globo and broadcast in its traditional schedule of 9 p.m. between May 25, 1998 and January 16, 1999.

Starring Tarcísio Meira, Glória Menezes, Cláudia Raia, Edson Celulari, Letícia Sabatella, Marcos Palmeira, Adriana Esteves, Juca de Oliveira, Natália do Vale, Maitê Proença and Tony Ramos in the lead roles.

History

Synopsis

First phase 
The former expert in fireworks, José Clementino gets a job as a bricklayer in the construction of a magnificent shopping center, one of the many works carried out by the construction engineer, César Toledo. During the feast of the ridge, where engineers and workers gather to celebrate the laying of the slab work, Clementino's wife flirts with several men. At one point, when he gives for the missing woman, Mason goes looking for her and is in a far corner of the building having sex with two men. Overcome with rage, Clementino kills his wife and one of the men paddle strokes. The family hears the screams and Toledo contains Clementino, with the help of a group of workers. Shocked by the violence of the employee, the employer called the police, and even later, an indictment against him at trial. His testimony is crucial to the conviction of Clementino, to discover their terrible crimes and audacious, which is a court suspicious.

Second phase 
Twenty years pass, and leaves the chain Clementino. The time he was exposed to the harsh reality of the prison system made him a man even more bitter. Although he tries to rebuild his life, is obsessed by the desire to avenge César Toledo, who deemed to have been largely responsible for his conviction.

César Toledo became a powerful businessman, but leads a life full of troubles. His marriage to Martha is in crisis and practically only be sustained thanks to her efforts. The union once shipwrecked when César finds an old love, the lawyer Lucia Prado, and the two begin a romance. The relationship with the children is not well resolved. The eldest, Henry, administers the affairs of the mall, but has a very different temperament from his father. Extravagant and vain, becomes the inauguration of the Tropical Towers in a pompous carnival event. Alexandre is the middle child of Toledo. A young law student who resents still depend on financial help from his father that he wishes to complete their studies before leaving home. The youngest son, William, is the main source of the torments of the family. Chemically dependent, involved in marginal, he lives fleeing rehab clinics and trying to extort money from relatives and friends to get support his habit. During the inauguration of the mall, after trying to get money without success, he breaks into a motorcycle the main lobby of the building and has to be restrained by security guards.

The family of José Clementino, over to the back when he gets out of jail, works and lives in the junkyard of his father, Agenor, a cruel and violent man who created no hard and love their children and grandchildren on the basis of physical torture and psychological. There live the two half-brothers Clementino, Gustinho and Dolls, and Shirley, his youngest daughter, a sweet and gracious young woman who suffers from a physical defect in the leg. She takes care of Juggernaut, a person with mental disability who lives as family and household work in the junkyard. In that environment cold and lifeless, there are some of the best comedic moments of the novel, thanks to fights and Gustinho Doll - living making fun and engaging with one another - and the intricacies of Juggernaut, a character who fell into the graces of the public.

The other daughter is Sandrinha Clementino. Unlike Shirley, she does not forgive his father for murdering his mother and feed negative feelings in relation to all other family members. It is a young and ambitious bad character who works as a waitress at the diner Edmundo Falcão, but will do anything to get along and move up in life. So get involved with Alexandre Toledo. Completely in love with the girl, he realizes that she is interested mainly in their money and who betrays him whenever possible.

In the cafeteria of Edmundo Falcão also works the waitress Bina Colombo, a woman spontaneous and funny, but also naive, which feeds the dream of becoming rich. She lives with Aunt Sadie in a small apartment, but the lives of two changes after that, thanks to a quirk of fate, the waitress becomes the owner of a fortune. Bina is always accompanied by his best friend, the docile cook Luzineide, who also works in the cafeteria and to whom she dazzles with her exuberant personality, preventing the girl utter a word, it is always blamed for a "Shut up, Luzineide!".

Kicking off his plan for revenge, José Clementino gets a job as caretaker of Tropical Towers. Thus, he planned to install explosives in the building. His plan is to destroy the great enterprise of César Toledo, but without hurting innocent. The explosives were detonated when the mall was empty. However, for mysterious reasons, the artifacts are triggered before the time when the building is filled. The explosion left many injured and killed several people. Some characters featured in the novel die in the explosion of Tropical Towers. William the troubled young man who torments the lives of Toledo, is one of them. Two other victims are the designer and former model Rafaela Leila Sampaio. Both are members of a fashion boutique and have a loving relationship.

The businesswoman Angela, right-hand man of the Toledo administration of the mall, nurtures a platonic passion for Henry Toledo, his best friend and coworker. Henry, however, is married to Vilma, besides being an incorrigible womanizer who collects romantic conquests, and feelings of unsuspecting girlfriend. Gradually, Angela's passion is becoming increasingly unhealthy, and to get what she wants, she gets a cold and ruthless killer, who comes to celebrate the deaths of their victims. Its end is tragic to discover that Henry would marry Celeste, the mother of a son of William, Angela rushes from the top of the Maksoud Hotel committing suicide.

When the romance between Lucia Prado and César Toledo comes to an end, the lawyer gets involved with Alexandre. At the end of the novel, having already agreed to the real character of Sandrinha, the son of César Toledo ultimately decides to stay with her ex-love of the father. César Toledo and Martha end up reconciling.

Under the name Johnny realizes, makes Gustinho success as crooner. In fact, Doll does have the talent to sing, but think is too ugly to present to the public. He then lends his voice to his brother, but feel frustrated at not being able to enjoy the fame. The farce comes to an end after a presentation on the Planet Xuxa. Xuxa Doll discovers that the real singer and takes backstage to the stage. Gustinho, in turn, discovers his true talent to win a chance at the team meadow in your neighborhood, becoming a professional football player very successful. Throughout the novel, Bina Colombo split between Edmundo Falcão, Gustinho and Dolls. She marries the owner of the diner, but the four characters end up together, forming a square love.

Cast and episodes 

Special Participation

Cast 

Participação Especial

External links

1998 Brazilian television series debuts
1999 Brazilian television series endings
1998 telenovelas
TV Globo telenovelas
Television shows set in São Paulo
Brazilian telenovelas
Brazilian LGBT-related television shows
Portuguese-language telenovelas